New Recording 47 (abbreviated NR47) is a five-member contemporary Singaporean a cappella group currently consisting of Amanda Ong, Sreshya Vishwanathan, Shaun Spencer, Sherwin Lam, and Ryan Han. Set apart by a combination of all five members' arrangement styles, they produce 
multilingual works of popular songs, oldies, local Singaporean music, as well as original material. Most recently, they were featured on Singapore Airlines' Made In Singapore playlist, as well as the 94th Oscars' We Don't Talk About Bruno segment. 

New Recording 47 has released one single to date, titled "What It Used To Be".

History

Background 

New Recording 47 began with Amanda Ong and Shaun Spencer, who are alumni of NP Voices A Cappella, as well as Lee Yee Kien, Raimi Rusydi, and Zach Teo, who are alumni of SP Vocal Talents. In 2018, they met up at a stairwell to sing together, and the first voice memo they recorded in May was labeled 'New Recording 47' on Raimi's Apple iPhone, hence the group name. 

In 2021, Lee Yee Kien, Raimi Rusydi, and Zach Teo left the group and made way for three new members, Sreshya Vishwanathan, Sherwin Lam, and Ryan Han. Sreshya is an alumnus of NUS Resonance, Ryan is an alumnus of SMU VOIX, and Sherwin is also currently in NUS Resonance and ORC4pella.

Post-COVID 

In 2021, they were featured on Shopee's 6.6 and 7.7 Great Shopee Sale on TikTok, covering both of the Shopee jingles. They also released their first single composed by Amanda Ong, titled "What It Used To Be". 

In 2022, "What It Used To Be" was featured on Singapore Airlines' Made In Singapore playlist, and one of their TikTok covers appeared in the 94th Oscar's We Don't Talk About Bruno segment. They also performed at Esplanade's Voices - A Festival of Song 2022 in the second a cappella showcase.

Members

Current members
Amanda Ong – soprano (2018–present)
Sreshya Vishwanathan – alto (2021–present)
Shaun Spencer – tenor (2018–present)
Sherwin Lam – bass, vocal percussion (2021–present)
Ryan Han – vocal percussion, baritone (2021–present)

Former members
Lee Yee Kien – vocal percussion, tenor (2018-2021)
Raimi Rusydi – bass, vocal percussion (2018-2021)
Zach Teo – alto (2018-2021)

Timeline

Discography

Singles

External links
New Recording 47 YouTube
New Recording 47 Facebook
New Recording 47 Instagram
New Recording 47 TikTok
New Recording 47 Spotify
New Recording 47 Apple Music
New Recording 47 Telegram Channel

References

Musical groups established in 2018
Professional a cappella groups
Singaporean musical groups